The Aihole Inscription, also known as the Aihole prashasti, is a nineteen line Sanskrit inscription at Meguti Jain temple in Aihole, Karnataka, India. An eulogy dated 634–635 CE, it was composed by the Jain poet Ravikirti in honor of his patron king Pulakesin Satyasraya (Pulakeshin II) of the Badami Chalukya dynasty. The inscription is partly damaged and corrupted – its last two lines were added at a later date. 

Since the 1870s, the inscription was recorded several times, revised, republished and retranslated by Fleet, Kielhorn and others. The inscription is a prashasti for the early Western Chalukyas. It is notable for its historical details mixed in with myth, and the scholarly disagreements it has triggered. It is also an important source of placing political events and literature – such as of Kalidasa – that must have been completed well before 634 CE, the date of this inscription.

Location and history

The Aihole inscription is found on the eastern side-wall of the Meguti Jain temple. Aihoḷe – also known as Ayyavole or Aryapura in historic texts – was the original capital of Western Chalukyas dynasty founded in 540 CE, before they moved their capital in the 7th-century to Badami. Under the Hindu dynasty of the Badami Chalukyas, the Malprabha valley sites – such as Aihole, Badami, Pattadakal and Mahakuta – emerged as major regional center of arts in early India and a cradle of Hindu and Jain temple architecture schools. They patronized both Dravida and Nagara styles of temples. Meguti Jain temple is one among the hundreds of temples built in that era, but one built many decades after the famed Badami cave temples and many others.

Fleet was the first to edit and publish a photo-lithograph of the Aihole inscription in 1876. However, errors led to another visit to Aihole and then Fleet published an improved photo-lithograph, a revised version of the text with his translation in 1879. The significance of the inscription and continued issues with reconciling its content with other inscriptions, attracted the interest of other scholars. In 1901, the Sanskrit scholar Kielhorn re-edited the inscription at the suggestion of Fleet. He published yet another improved version of the photo-lithograph.

Description

The inscription has 19 lines of Sanskrit in old Chalukyan script. It is on a stone set as a part of the east outer wall of the Meguti temple, with the text covering about 4.75 feet by 2 feet surface. The letters are between 0.5 to 0.62 inches in height. The stylistic difference suggests that the 18th and 19th lines were corruptions added later, and are not of Ravikirti.

The Aihole inscription is in Sanskrit language, all in verse, using classic chhandas (meters, Sanskrit prosody). The 17 original lines consist of 37 verses. The meters deployed include the standard shlokas in 7 verses, 2 in aupachchhandasika, 3 in arya,  4 of vasantatilaka, 5 in malini, 3 in sardulavikridita, and all other verses deploy other distinct types of chandas each, such as upajati, indravajra, vamsastha, and others. The rules of Sanskrit meters are accurately followed in the Aihole inscription, which suggests that the early 7th-century Ravikirti was well trained in classical Sanskrit tradition.

The inscription is a prashasti. It weaves mythologies and exaggerates. The author compares his patron king Pulakesin II to legends, and compares himself to some of the greatest Sanskrit poets such Kalidasa and Bharavi – revered in the Hindu tradition. Yet, the inscription borrows phrases from Kalidasa's influential work, in the fashion of some of the famous 6th and 7th-century inscriptions found in Nagarjuni hills, in Bodh-Gaya, and one of the earliest known inscriptions in Cambodia. Further, in the Aihole inscription, Ravikirti borrows and builds upon several additional verses found in Raghuvaṃśa of Kalidasa and the Kirātārjunīya of Bharavi – famed works of Hindu Vishnu and Shiva traditions respectively. To his credit, Ravikirti credits these authors by naming them indirectly in his Aihole inscription, by calling himself as good as them. According to Kielhorn, this is exaggeration, but the purity of the Sanskrit and the poetic flourish of Ravikriti's composition per the alamkara-sastras does show that he was "in the very front rank of court-poets and writers of prashastis" of his times. According to Richard Salomon, the Aihole inscription excels in its grammatical correctness and literary polish, just like many other early Sanskrit inscriptions such as the Allahabad inscription and Deopara inscription.

The Aihole inscription is a Jain inscription. It is an integral part of the Meguti Jain temple, and announces the completion of the Meguti Jain temple. The inscription itself opens with the standard Jain salutations to Jinendra in verse 1. It is a prashasti and among other things, it praises Pulakesin II for his generosity and gifts.

Date
The verses 33–34 of the inscription state the date to be the year 3735 after the Bharata war, or saka samvat 556. This corresponds to 634–635 CE.

Inscription
The nineteen lines of the inscription has been variously translated. The translation published by Kielhorn is as follows:

Significance 
The Aihole inscription, with its different published translations has been a source of Deccan and Indian history in the 6th and 7th-century. It is also a source of controversies and inconsistencies when the claims in the Aihole inscriptions are compared to inscriptions found outside of Badami Chalukya kingdom. According to Richard Salomon – an Indologist specializing in epigraphical records, the Aihole inscription is a useful source of simple facts such as the date of Melguti Jain temple, Ravikirti's role in building it, the fame of Kalidasa, the state of language and literature in early 7th-century. The Aihole inscription is also significant by providing a definite terminus ante quem of 634 CE for both Kalidasa and Bharavi.
The Aihole inscription has been a source of literary and political history close to Ravikirti's generation (early 7th century), but given the highly rhetorical style that blends historic myth, fiction and events, one aimed to boast and flatter one's employer in general public, it need not be historically accurate. Further, states Salomon, one must expect that a court poet would "gloss over, distort, or simply ignore their patron's military defeats". The Aihole inscription must be evaluated in light of independent and reliable corroborative sources, which unfortunately are quite limited.

Except for a few events, many of the claims in the Aihole inscription cannot be confirmed. The victory of Pulakesin II over king Harsha can be corroborated in the writings of Xuanzang (Hsuan Tsang), the Chinese pilgrim who visited India in the 7th-century. However, if the Chinese record is to be read in full and trusted, then the Aihole inscription is glossing over many details. The Harsha-Pulakesin II war continued, records the Chinese pilgrim, because the troops and citizens of Harsha did not submit to Pulakeshin II. The first battle was indeed won by Pulakeshin, yet shortly thereafter it was Harsha who defeated Pulakeshin II near Narmada river in 612 CE (about 20 years before the Ravikirti's inscription). If inscriptions found in central India and the Chinese record are to be trusted, then there was a truce after both sides having won a war, Harsha ruled peacefully for next 30 years to the north of the Narmada river, while Pulakeshin II stayed in the Deccan region. Some scholars have questioned whether the war occurred in 612 CE, or 620 CE, or in early 630s CE because inscriptions found elsewhere are not consistent with the claims of Ravikirti. The Aihole Prashasti is, at its best, a panegyric record that records some battles.

This Chalukyan era Meguti temple inscription is inconsistent with many later Chalukyan inscriptions, states Altekar. For example, later Chalukyan inscriptions allege that its early rulers from Jayasimha and Pulakesin II defeated early Rashtrakuta kings, yet the Aihole inscription makes no mention of these early Rashtrakuta kings. This suggests that stories were being fabricated and inscribed on stone or copper plates. Similarly, Chalukyan copper plates state that Mangalesha handed over the kingdom to Pulakesin II when he came of age, with the added flourish that "can a scion of the Chalukya family ever swerve from the path of duty?". The later records thus assert that there was no war of succession between Mangalesha and Pulakesin II, something the Aihole inscription clearly mentions. Both cannot be true. Either Aihole inscription or the copper plates of Chalukyan dynasty are telling a "pious lie". According to Altekar, this is a gross contradiction, and then sides with Meguti inscription's version. Further, Altekar disagrees with Fleet, and interprets Indra as the name of a real king, rather than deity Indra (Sakra).

According to Raychaudhuri, Ravikirti's claims in verse 22 of the Aihole inscription are unreal and likely an exaggeration in light of inscriptions found in Madhya Pradesh and Gujarat, along with the records of the Chinese pilgrim Xuanzang. Malwa remained independent, as did the Gurjaras. The evidence outside of the Aihole inscription suggests that they were not Pulakesin II's feudatories.

See also
Indian inscriptions

Notes

References

Bibliography
Abraham Eraly (2011), The first spring: The golden age of India, Penguin Books, 
J. F. Fleet (1876), Editor: Jas Burgess, Indian Antiquary, Volume V, A Journal of Oriental Research, 
J. F. Fleet (1879), Editor: Jas Burgess, Indian Antiquary, Volume VIII,A Journal of Oriental Research, 
F. Kielhorn (1901), Editor: E. Hultzsch, Epigraphia Indica, Volume VI, Archaeological Survey of India, 
Adam Hardy (1995), Indian Temple Architecture: Form and Transformation: the Karṇāṭa Drāviḍa Tradition, 7th to 13th Centuries, Abhinav Publications, 

George Michell (2014), Temple Architecture and Art of the Early Chalukyas, Niyogi Books, 

Richard Salomon (1998), Indian Epigraphy: A Guide to the Study of Inscriptions in Sanskrit, Prakrit, and the other Indo-Aryan Languages, Oxford University Press,

External links
Epigraphia Indica, Vol. VI (1900–01). ASI, Reprinted 1996 Swati Publications.

7th-century inscriptions
Indian inscriptions
History of Karnataka

Jain inscriptions
Badami Chalukya inscriptions